Karuyeh (also Romanized as Kārūyeh; also known as Kāravīeh and Karveh) is a village in Golestan Rural District, in the Central District of Falavarjan County, Isfahan Province, Iran. At the 2006 census, its population was 1,096 and 281 families.

References 

Populated places in Falavarjan County